Lars-Erik Efverström (February 26, 1925, Hållnäs, Uppland – January 26, 2003) was a Swedish nordic skier who competed in the 1940s and 1950s. At the 1952 Winter Olympics, Efverström finished 17th in the nordic combined event and 58th in the 18 km cross-country skiing event.

Cross-country skiing results

Olympic Games

External links
Olympic cross country skiing 18 km results: 1948-52
Olympic nordic combined results: 1948-64

1925 births
2003 deaths
People from Tierp Municipality
Cross-country skiers from Uppsala County
Olympic cross-country skiers of Sweden
Olympic Nordic combined skiers of Sweden
Cross-country skiers at the 1952 Winter Olympics
Nordic combined skiers at the 1952 Winter Olympics
Swedish male cross-country skiers
Swedish male Nordic combined skiers